The UK Singles Chart is one of many music charts compiled by the Official Charts Company that calculates the best-selling singles of the week in the United Kingdom. Since 2004 the chart has been based on the sales of both physical singles and digital downloads, with airplay figures excluded from the official chart. Since 2014, the singles chart has been based on both sales and streaming, with the ratio altered in 2017 to 150:1 streams and only three singles by the same artist eligible for the chart. From July 2018, video streams from YouTube Music and Spotify among others began to be counted for the Official Charts. This list shows singles that peaked in the Top 10 of the UK Singles Chart during 2019, as well as singles which peaked in 2018 and 2020 but were in the top 10 in 2019. The entry date is when the song appeared in the top 10 for the first time (week ending, as published by the Official Charts Company, which is six days after the chart is announced).

One-hundred and six singles were in the top ten this year. Twelve singles from 2018 remained in the top 10 for several weeks at the beginning of the year, while "Before You Go" by Lewis Capaldi, "Own It" by Stormzy featuring Ed Sheeran and Burna Boy, "River" by Ellie Goulding and "Roxanne" by Arizona Zervas were all released in 2019 but did not reach their peak until 2020. "All I Want for Christmas is You" by Mariah Carey, "Fairytale of New York" by The Pogues featuring Kirsty MacColl, "Last Christmas" by Wham!, "Nothing Breaks Like a Heart" by Mark Ronson featuring Miley Cyrus, "Rewrite the Stars" by James Arthur featuring Anne-Marie, "Sunflower" by Post Malone featuring Swae Lee and "Sweet but Psycho" by Ava Max were the singles from 2018 to reach their peak in 2019.  Twenty-two artists scored multiple entries in the top ten in 2019. AJ Tracey, Billie Eilish, Lewis Capaldi and Troye Sivan were among the many artists who achieved their first top 10 single in 2019.

The first number-one single of the year was "Sweet but Psycho" by Ava Max.  Overall, eleven different singles peaked at number-one in 2019, with Ed Sheeran (3) having the most singles hit that position. An asterisk (*) in the "Weeks in Top 10" column shows that the song is currently in the top 10.

Background

Non-mover top 12
The top 12 singles on the chart on 13 June 2019 (week ending), all remained at their positions from the previous week. The singles included "I Don't Care" by Ed Sheeran and Justin Bieber at 1, "Old Town Road" by Lil Nas X at 2, "Someone You Loved" by Lewis Capaldi at 3, "Vossi Bop" by Stormzy at 4, "Bad Guy" by Billie Eilish at 5, "Piece of Your Heart" by Meduza featuring Goodboys at 6, "Hold Me While You Wait" by Lewis Capaldi at 7, "SOS" by Avicii featuring Aloe Blacc at 8, "Cross Me" by Ed Sheeran featuring Chance the Rapper and PnB Rock at 9, "If I Can't Have You" by Shawn Mendes at 10, "All Day and Night" by Jax Jones, Martin Solveig and Madison Beer at 11 and "Location" by Dave featuring Burna Boy at 12.

LadBaby back-to-back Christmas number-ones
YouTube vlogger LadBaby (real name Mark Hoyle) and his wife Roxy created a slice of chart history as they achieved a second successive Christmas number-one with their parody of "I Love Rock 'n' Roll", re-titled "I Love Sausage Rolls". They had first topped the chart in 2018 with another parody single based on "We Built This City", raising money for the food charity Trussell Trust. They became only the second act after Spice Girls to score back-to-back Christmas chart toppers, and it was also the first time in history where two novelty singles reached Christmas number-one in successive years.

On the flipside, the sales dropped off in its second week and the single fell to number 57, meaning they also joined Elvis Presley as only the second act to see two number-one singles fall out of the top 10 straight from the top spot. His reissued singles "One Night"/"I Got Stung" and "It's Now or Never" from 2005 both dropped out of the top 10 the week after topping the chart. "We Built This City" had slipped from number-one to number 21 in the space of a week at the end of 2018.

Chart debuts
Forty-two artists achieved their first charting top 10 single in 2019.  Four acts have had a second single reach the top 10: Russ, Tion Wayne, AJ Tracey, and Headie One. Aitch, Billie Eilish, and Burna Boy achieved two more chart hits in 2019. Lewis Capaldi had five more entries in his breakthrough year.

The following table (collapsed on desktop site) does not include acts who had previously charted as part of a group and secured their first top 10 solo single.

Notes
Normani Kordei made her solo top 10 chart debut with "Dancing with a Stranger" by Sam Smith after following two top 10 hits with Fifth Harmony. Brendon Urie, the lead singer of Panic! At the Disco, had never previously achieved a top 10 single in over a decade career with his group, the closest to this milestone "High Hopes", peaked at number twelve in 2018. However, he made his solo top 10 debut by featuring on "Me!".

Songs from films
Original songs from various films entered the top 10 throughout the year. These included "Sunflower" (from Spider-Man: Into the Spider-verse) and "Don't Call Me Angel" (Charlie's Angels).

Additionally, "Rewrite the Stars" by James Arthur and Anne-Marie also entered the top 10 at number 8, however despite being from The Greatest Showman, this entry was part of The Greatest Showman: Reimagined soundtrack. The original version was sung by Zac Efron and Zendaya in the film.

Best-selling singles
Lewis Capaldi had the best-selling single of the year with "Someone You Loved". The song spent 21 weeks in the top 10 (including seven weeks at number-one), sold over 1,800,000 copies and was certified 3× platinum by the BPI.  "Old Town Road" by Lil Nas X came in second place, while Ed Sheeran and Justin Bieber's "I Don't Care", "Bad Guy" by Billie Eilish and "Giant" from Calvin Harris & Rag'n'Bone Man made up the top five. Singles by Ava Max, Stormzy, Tones & I, Mabel and Shawn Mendes and Camila Cabello were also in the top ten best-selling singles of the year.

Top-ten singles
Key

Entries by artist

The following table shows artists who have achieved two or more top 10 entries in 2019, including singles that reached their peak in 2018. The figures include both main artists and featured artists, while appearances on ensemble charity records are also counted for each artist. The total number of weeks an artist spent in the top ten in 2019 is also shown.

Notes 

 "Shotgun" re-entered the top 10 at number 7 on 10 January 2019 (week ending).
 "Lost Without You" re-entered the top 10 at number 9 on 17 January 2019 (week ending).
 "Sunflower" re-entered the top 10 at number 3 on 10 January 2019 (week ending).
 "Zeze" re-entered the top 10 at number 10 on 10 January 2019 (week ending).
 "Without Me" re-entered the top 10 at number 10 on 17 January 2019 (week ending).
 "Sweet but Psycho" re-entered the top 10 at number 10 on 28 February 2019 (week ending).
 "All I Want for Christmas" re-entered the top 10 on 13 December 2018 (week ending), having originally peaked at number 2 upon release in 1994.
 "Rewrite the Stars" re-entered the top 10 at number 8 on 10 January 2019 (week ending).
 "Nothing Breaks Like a Heart" re-entered the top 10 at number 4 on 10 January 2019 (week ending).
 "Last Christmas" re-entered the top 10 on 20 December 2018 (week ending), having originally peaked at number 2 upon release in 1984.
 "Fairytale of New York" re-entered the top 10 at number 10 on 20 December 2018 (week ending), having originally peaked at number 2 upon release in 1987. It re-entered the top 10 again at number 4 on 3 January 2019 (week ending).
 Released as a charity single by Band Aid in 1984 to aid famine relief in Ethiopia.
 "Do They Know It's Christmas?" re-entered the top 10 on 3 January 2019 (week ending), having originally peaked at number 1 upon release in 1984.
 "One More Sleep" re-entered the top 10 on 3 January 2019 (week ending), having originally peaked at number 3 upon release in 2013.
 "Merry Christmas Everyone" re-entered the top 10 on 3 January 2019 (week ending), having originally peaked at number 1 upon release in 1985. 
 "Step into Christmas" originally peaked at number 24 on its initial release in 1973. It reached the top 20 for the first time in 2017, peaking at number 11.
 "Someone You Loved" re-entered the top 10 at number 10 on 11 June 2019 (week ending).
 "Bury a Friend" re-entered the top 10 at number 6 on 11 April 2019 (week ending) following the release of the album When We All Fall Asleep, Where Do We Go?.
 "Location" re-entered the top 10 at number 10 on 9 May 2019 (week ending).
 "Bad Guy" re-entered the top 10 at number 5 on 1 August 2019 (week ending), following the subsequent release of the remix featuring Justin Bieber.
 "Talk" re-entered the top 10 at number 10 on 2 May 2019 (week ending).
 "I Don't Care" re-entered the top 10 at number 3 on 1 August 2019 (week ending).
 "All Day and Night" re-entered the top 10 at number 10 on 20 June 2019 (week ending).
 "Take Me Back to London" re-entered the top 10 at number 10 on 22 August 2019 (week ending).
 "So High" re-entered the top 10 at number 8 on 22 August 2019 (week ending).
 Figure includes single that peaked in 2018.
 Figure includes appearance on Headie One's "18 Hunna".
 Figure includes appearance on Ed Sheeran's "Take Me Back to London".
 Figure includes single that first charted in 2018 but peaked in 2019.
 Figure includes appearance on Ed Sheeran's "Beautiful People".
 Figure includes a top-ten hit with the group Wham!.
 Figure includes an appearance on the "Do They Know It's Christmas?" charity single by Band Aid.
 Figure includes appearance on Tion Wayne's "Options".
 "Take Me Back to London" re-entered the top 10 at number 1 on 5 September following the subsequent remix featuring Aitch and JayKae.
 "Goodbyes" re-entered the top 10 at number 10 on 19 September following the release of the album Hollywood's Bleeding.
 Figure includes appearance on "Nothing Breaks Like a Heart".
 Figure includes appearance on "Don't Call Me Angel".
 "Ransom" re-entered the top 10 at number 10 on 10 October 2019 (week ending).
 Figure includes appearance on "South of the Border".
 Figure includes appearance on "Strike a Pose".
 Figure includes appearance on "Location".
 Figure includes appearance on "Be Honest".
 "Good as Hell" entered the top 10 at number 7 on 7 November 2019 (week ending), following the subsequent release of the remix featuring Ariana Grande.
 Figure includes appearance on "Own It".
 "All I Want For Christmas" re-entered the top 10 at number 8 on 12 December 2019 (week ending).
 "Last Christmas" re-entered the top 10 at number 7 on 19 December 2019 (week ending).
 "River" re-entered the top 10 at number 1 on 2 January 2020 (week ending).
 "Dance Monkey" re-entered the top 10 at number 5 on 9 January 2020 (week ending).
 "Lose You to Love Me" re-entered the top 10 at number 10 on 9 January 2020 (week ending).
 "Don't Start Now" re-entered the top 10 at number 3 on 9 January 2020 (week ending).
 "Everything I Wanted" re-entered the top 10 at number 6 on 9 January 2020 (week ending).
 "Roxanne" re-entered the top 10 at number 4 on 9 January 2020 (week ending).
 "Before You Go" re-entered the top 10 at number 2 on 9 January 2020 (week ending).
 "Someone You Loved" re-entered the top 10 at number 7 on 16 January 2020 (week ending).
 "Everything I Wanted" re-entered the top 10 at number 8 on 6 February 2020 (week ending).

See also
2019 in British music
List of number-one singles from the 2010s (UK)

References
General

Specific

External links
2019 singles chart archive at the Official Charts Company (click on relevant week)

United Kingdom top 10 singles
Top 10 singles
2019